National Route 267 is a national highway of Japan connecting Hitoyoshi, Kumamoto and Satsumasendai, Kagoshima in Japan, with a total length of 82.7 km (51.39 mi).

References

National highways in Japan
Roads in Kagoshima Prefecture
Roads in Kumamoto Prefecture